Agonopterix heracliana is a moth of the family Depressariidae. It is found in most of Europe, North Africa, the Near East, and the eastern part of the Palearctic realm. It was first described in 1758 by Carl Linnaeus in the 10th edition of Systema Naturae.

Description
The wingspan is 17–25 mm. The terminal joint of palpi with two blackish bands. Forewings light greyish ochreous suffused with pale brownish; some dark fuscous dashes, most distinct before fascia; more conspicuous cloudy dashes in place of stigmata, second discal stigma sometimes including a whitish dot; a distinct pale acutely angulated fascia at 3/4; terminal blackish dots. Hindwings whitish fuscous. The larva is grey, on sides dull yellow; spots black; head and plate of 2 black

Adults are on wing from September to April.

The larvae spin the leaves of a variety of umbelliferous plants, including Heracleum sphondylium, Anthriscus sylvestris, Chaerophyllum temulum, and most other Umbelliferae including Angelica sylvestris, Aegopodium podagraria, Conopodium majus, Daucus, Meum, Myrrhis, Oenanthe, Pastinaca, Silaum, Sison, Smyrnium, Torilis and Ligusticum.

References

External links
 Lepiforum.de

Agonopterix
Moths described in 1758
Moths of Africa
Moths of Asia
Moths of Europe
Taxa named by Carl Linnaeus